Mato Raia is a settlement in the central part of the island of Santiago, Cape Verde. It is part of the municipality São Lourenço dos Órgãos. It is located about a kilometer north from the city of João Teves. In 2010 its population was 181.

References

Villages and settlements in Santiago, Cape Verde
São Lourenço dos Órgãos